The two-round system (TRS), also known as runoff voting, second ballot, or ballotage, is a voting method used to elect a single candidate, where voters cast a single vote for their preferred candidate. It generally ensures a majoritarian result, not a simple-plurality result as under first past the post. Under the two-round election system, the election process usually proceeds to a second round only if in the first round no candidate received a simple majority (more than 50%) of votes cast, or some other lower prescribed percentage. Under the two-round system, usually only the two candidates who received the most votes in the first round, or only those candidates who received above a prescribed proportion of the votes, are candidates in the second round. Other candidates are excluded from the second round.

The two-round system is widely used in the election of legislative bodies and directly elected presidents, as well as in other contexts, such as in the election of political-party leaders or within companies. 

The second round of voting must be held after there is sufficient time to count and verify the results of the first round. Second rounds may be held on the same day in smaller settings, or up to one month later, as in the US state of Georgia. France traditionally has a two-week break before the second round.

Terminology
The two-round system is known as runoff voting in the United States, where the second round is known as a runoff election.

Runoff voting may also sometimes be used as a generic term to describe any voting method that involves a number of rounds of voting, with eliminations after each round. By this broader definition the two-round system is not the only form of runoff voting, and others include the exhaustive ballot and instant-runoff voting. However, the subject of this article is the two-round system. In Canada, for example, when there are more than two candidates for political-party leadership, an exhaustive-ballot system (often called a runoff-voting method) is used where one candidate must win a simple majority (over half). Candidates with the fewest votes or candidates who want to move their support to other candidates may also move to remove themselves from the next vote.

Voting and counting
In both rounds of an election conducted using runoff voting, the voter simply marks their preferred candidate. If no candidate has an absolute majority of votes (i.e. more than half) in the first round, then the two candidates with the most votes proceed to a second round, from which all others are excluded. In the second round, because there are only two candidates, and absent a tie vote, one candidate will achieve an absolute majority. Voters may change the candidate they support in the second round.

Some variants of the two-round system use a different rule for choosing candidates for the second round, and allow more than two candidates to proceed to the second round. Under such methods, it is sufficient for a candidate to receive a plurality of votes (more votes than anyone else) to be elected in the second round. In Czech and Kenyan presidential elections, the candidates in first and second place are permitted to stand in the second round, with all other candidates eliminated, thus providing the contingency for a first- or second-place tie; a plurality is then sufficient to be elected. However, in Ghana, which also employs this contingency method, the majority requirement still holds in the second round, and a third round would be held if it is not obtained. Under some variants of runoff voting, there is no formal rule for eliminating candidates, but candidates who receive fewer votes in the first round are expected to withdraw voluntarily.

Examples

French presidential elections

2002

In the 2002 French presidential election, the two contenders described by the media as possible winners were Jacques Chirac and Lionel Jospin, who represented the largest two political parties in France at the time. However, 16 candidates were on the ballot, including Jean-Pierre Chevènement (5.33%) and Christiane Taubira (2.32%) from the Plural Left coalition of Jospin, who refused by excess of confidence to dissuade them. With the left vote divided among a number of candidates, a third contender, Jean-Marie Le Pen, unexpectedly obtained slightly more than Jospin in the first round:

 Jacques Chirac (Centre-right, Gaullist): 19.88%
 Jean-Marie Le Pen (Far-right, National Front): 16.86%
 Lionel Jospin (Centre-left, Socialist): 16.18%
The other candidates received smaller percentages on the first round.

Because no candidate had obtained an absolute majority of the votes in the first round, the top two candidates went into the second round. Most supporters of the parties which did not get through to the second round (and Chirac's supporters) voted for Chirac, who won with a very large majority:

 Jacques Chirac (Centre-right, Gaullist): 82.21%
 Jean-Marie Le Pen (Far-right, National Front): 17.79%

German Weimar Republic
The President of Germany was popularly elected in 1925 and 1932 by a two-round system. In the second round, a candidate could run even if they had not done so in the first round, and they did not require an absolute majority to win. In both elections, the communist candidate, Ernst Thälmann, did not withdraw and ran in the second round. In 1925, that probably ensured the election of Paul von Hindenburg (with only 48.3% of the vote), rather than Wilhelm Marx, the centrist candidate. Hindenburg had not run in the first round of the 1925 election.

Variant
A variant of the two-round system, where only the top two parties from the first round enter the second round, is applied in Bhutanese National Assembly.

Similar methods

Voting systems

Exhaustive ballot

The exhaustive ballot (EB) is similar to the two-round system, but involves more rounds of voting rather than just two. If no candidate receives an absolute majority in the first round then the candidate(s) with the fewest votes is eliminated and excluded from further ballots. The process of exclusion and reballot continues until one candidate has an absolute majority. Because voters may have to cast votes several times, EB is not used in large-scale public elections. Instead it is used in smaller contests such as the election of the presiding officer of an assembly; one long-standing example of its use is in the United Kingdom, where local associations (LCAs) of the Conservative Party use EB to elect their prospective parliamentary candidates (PPCs). Exhaustive ballot is also used by FIFA and the International Olympic Committee to select hosts. EB often elects a different winner from runoff voting. Because the two-round system excludes more than one candidate after the first round, it is possible for a candidate to be eliminated who would have gone on to win the election under EB.

A hybrid system of EB is used by the Libertarian Party of the United States to select its presidential and vice-presidential nominees. It is hybrid because "None of the Above" (NOTA) is always on the ballot, regardless of its percentage, and because in the first round, if no majority is reached for any candidate, the lowest candidate (other than NOTA) is eliminated, along with all other candidates who did not earn 5% of the vote. The end result of this is that the first round of voting tends to eliminate the lesser candidates, and there is always the possibility that nobody wins.

Instant-runoff voting

Instant-runoff voting (IRV) (also known as preferential voting or ranked-choice voting) like the exhaustive ballot involves multiple reiterative counts in which the candidate with fewest votes is eliminated each time. Whilst the exhaustive ballot and the two-round system both involve voters casting a separate vote in each round, under instant-runoff, voters vote only once. This is possible because, rather than voting for only a single candidate, the voter ranks all of the candidates in order of preference. These preferences are then used to transfer the votes of those whose first preference has been eliminated during the course of the count. Because the two-round system and the exhaustive ballot involve separate rounds of voting, voters can use the results of one round to decide how they will vote in the next, whereas this is not possible under IRV. Because it is necessary only to vote once, IRV is used for elections in many places. For such as Australian general and state elections (called preferential voting). In the United States, it's known as ranked-choice voting and is used in a growing number of states and localities. In Ireland it is known as single transferable vote and is used for presidential elections and parliamentary elections.

Variants of instant-runoff voting can be designed to reflect the same rules as a two-round voting system. If no single candidate has an absolute majority of votes then only the two highest polling candidates progress to the second count, while all other candidates are excluded and their votes redistributed according to the recorded preferences for continuing candidates. One variant that works this way is called the Contingent vote, detailed below.

Contingent vote

The contingent vote is a variant of instant-runoff voting that has been used in the past in Queensland, Australia. Under the contingent vote voters cast only one vote, by ranking all of the candidates in order of preference. However it involves only two rounds of counting and uses the same rule for eliminating candidates as the two-round system. After the first round all but the two candidates with most votes are eliminated. Therefore, one candidate always achieves an absolute majority in the second round. Because of these similarities the contingent vote tends to elect the same winner as the two-round system, and may produce different results to instant-runoff voting.

A variant of the contingent vote, called the supplementary vote, is used to elect some mayors in the United Kingdom. Another variant elects the President of Sri Lanka. A criticism of this method is that "it requires two polls, and gives opportunity for intrigue of various kinds."

Non-voting systems

Louisiana and nonpartisan blanket primary systems

In the United States, the Louisiana primary, introduced in Louisiana for partisan state elections in 1975 and federal elections in 1978 (with a brief return using a closed primary system in 2010), is virtually identical to the two-round system. Instead of the standard American system of primary elections to choose each party's candidate, followed by a general election contest between the winners of the primaries, the Louisiana primary allows voters to select any candidate, regardless of party affiliation. Candidates receiving an absolute majority of the votes cast are declared the winner. Otherwise, the two highest vote-winners in the first round—in effect, the first round of a two-round system—are then the only candidates whose names appear on the ballot at a runoff election, effectively requiring one candidate to win an absolute majority to take office. The key difference between the Louisiana primary and a typical two-round system is that political parties do not select the individuals using their party labels; rather, candidates can self-identify using the label of their preferred political party (or no party at all).

The state of Washington adopted a system similar to Louisiana's in 2008, which came into effect in 2010 after legal difficulties. California approved a similar system in 2010, coming into effect for the 36th congressional district election in February 2011. The system used in Washington and California is referred to as the nonpartisan blanket primary or top-two primary system. Like the Louisiana primary, candidates self-select their party label on the ballot rather than being nominated by a particular political party.

The main difference between a nonpartisan blanket primary and either a standard two-round system or the Louisiana primary is that a second round of voting is required, even if a candidate wins an absolute majority of votes in the primary.

Two-party-preferred vote

In Australian politics (predominantly in the lower (senatorial/house) level(s)), the two-party-preferred vote (TPP or 2PP), is the result of an election or opinion poll after preferences have been distributed to the highest two candidates, who in some cases can be independents. For the purposes of TPP, the Liberal/National Coalition is usually considered a single party, with Labor being the other major party. Typically the TPP is expressed as the percentages of votes attracted by each of the two major parties, e.g. "Coalition 45%, Labor 55%", where the values include both primary votes and preferences. The TPP is an indicator of how much swing has been attained/is required to change the result, taking into consideration preferences, which may have a significant effect on the result.

Compliance with voting method criteria
Most of the mathematical criteria by which voting methods are compared were formulated for voters with ordinal preferences. Some methods, like approval voting, request information than cannot be unambiguously inferred from a single set of ordinal preferences. The two-round system is such a method, because the voters are not forced to vote according to a single ordinal preference in both rounds.

Since the two-round system requires more information from each voter than a single ordinal ballot provides, one cannot fit the criteria that are formulated expressly for voters with ordinal preferences without making a generalization as to how the voters will behave. The same problem exists in Approval voting, where one has to make assumptions as to how the voters will place their approval cutoffs.

If the voters determine their preferences before the election and always vote directly consistent to them, they will emulate the contingent vote and get the same results as if they were to use that method. Therefore, in that model of voting behavior, the two-round system passes all criteria that the contingent vote passes, and fails all criteria the contingent vote fails.

Since the voters in the two-round system do not have to choose their second round votes while voting in the first round, they are able to adjust their votes as players in a game. More complex models consider voter behavior when the voters reach a game-theoretical equilibrium from which they have no incentive, as defined by their internal preferences, to further change their behavior. However, because these equilibria are complex, only partial results are known. With respect to the voters' internal preferences, the two-round system passes the majority criterion in this model, as a majority can always coordinate to elect their preferred candidate. Also, in the case of three candidates or less and a robust political equilibrium, the two-round system will pick the Condorcet winner whenever there is one, which is not the case in the Contingent vote model.

The equilibrium mentioned above is a perfect-information equilibrium and so only strictly holds in idealized conditions where every voter knows every other voter's preference. Thus it provides an upper bound on what can be achieved with rational (self-interested) coordination or knowledge of others' preferences. Since the voters almost surely will not have perfect information, it may not apply to real elections. In that matter, it is similar to the perfect competition model sometimes used in economics. To the extent that real elections approach this upper bound, large elections would do so less so than small ones, because it is less likely that a large electorate has information about all the other voters than that a small electorate has.

Tactical voting and strategic nomination

Runoff voting is intended to reduce the potential for eliminating "wasted" votes by tactical voting. Under the plurality voting system (also known as first past the post), voters are encouraged to vote tactically, by voting for only one of the two leading candidates, because a vote for any other candidate will not affect the result. Under runoff voting, this tactic, known as "compromising", it is sometimes unnecessary because even if a voter's favorite candidate is eliminated in the first round, they will still have an opportunity to influence the result of the election by voting for a more popular candidate in the second round. However the tactic of compromising can still be used in runoff voting—it is sometimes necessary to compromise as a way of influencing which two candidates will survive to the second round. In order to do this it is necessary to vote for one of the three leading candidates in the first round, just as in an election held under the plurality method it is necessary to vote for one of the two leading candidates.

Runoff voting is also vulnerable to another tactic called "push over". This is a tactic by which voters vote tactically for an unpopular "push over" candidate in the first round as a way of helping their true favourite candidate win in the second round. The purpose of voting for the push over, in theory, is to ensure that it is this weak candidate, rather than a stronger rival, who survives to challenge one's preferred candidate in the second round. But in practice, such a tactic may prove counter-productive. If so many voters give their first preferences to the "weak" candidate that it ends up winning the first round, it is highly likely they will gain enough campaign momentum to have a strong chance of winning the runoff, too, and with it, the election. At the very least, their opponent would have to start taking the so-called weak candidate seriously, particularly if the runoff follows quickly after the first round.

Runoff voting can be influenced by strategic nomination; this is where candidates and political factions influence the result of an election by either nominating extra candidates or withdrawing a candidate who would otherwise have stood. Runoff voting is vulnerable to strategic nomination for the same reasons that it is open to the voting tactic of compromising. This is because a candidate who knows they are unlikely to win can ensure that another candidate they support makes it to the second round by withdrawing from the race before the first round occurs, or by never choosing to stand in the first place. By withdrawing candidates a political faction can avoid the spoiler effect, whereby a candidate "splits the vote" of its supporters. A famous example of this spoiler effect occurred in the 2002 French presidential election, when so many left-wing candidates stood in the first round that all of them were eliminated and two right-wing candidates advanced to the second round. Conversely, an important faction may have an interest in helping fund the campaign of smaller factions with a very different political agenda, so that these smaller parties end up weakening their own agenda.

Impact on factions and candidates
Runoff voting encourages candidates to appeal to a broad cross-section of voters. This is because, in order to win an absolute majority in the second round, it is necessary for a candidate to win the support of voters whose favourite candidate has been eliminated. Under runoff voting, between rounds of voting, eliminated candidates, and the factions who previously supported them, often issue recommendations to their supporters as to whom to vote for in the second round of the contest. This means that eliminated candidates are still able to influence the result of the election. This influence leads to political bargaining between the two remaining candidates and the parties and candidates who have been eliminated, sometimes resulting in the two successful candidates making policy concessions to the less successful ones. Because it encourages conciliation and negotiation in these ways, runoff voting is advocated, in various forms, by some supporters of deliberative democracy.

Runoff voting is designed for single-seat constituencies. Therefore, like other single-seat methods, if used to elect a council or legislature it will not produce proportional representation (PR). This means that it is likely to lead to the representation of a small number of larger parties in an assembly, rather than a proliferation of small parties. In practice, runoff voting produces results very similar to those produced by the plurality method, and encourages a two-party system similar to those found in many countries that use plurality. Under a parliamentary system, it is more likely to produce single-party governments than are PR methods, which tend to produce coalition governments. While runoff voting is designed to ensure that each individual candidate elected is supported by a majority of those in their constituency, if used to elect an assembly it does not ensure this result on a national level. As in other non-PR methods, the party or coalition which wins a majority of seats will often not have the support of an absolute majority of voters across the nation.

Majoritarianism
The intention of runoff voting is that the winning candidate will have the support of an absolute majority of voters. Under the first past the post method the candidate with most votes (a plurality) wins, even if they do not have an absolute majority (more than half) of votes. The two-round system tries to overcome this problem by permitting only two candidates in the second round, so that one must receive an absolute majority of votes.

Critics argue that the absolute majority obtained by the winner of runoff voting is an artificial one. Instant-runoff voting and the exhaustive ballot are two other voting methods that create an absolute majority for one candidate by eliminating weaker candidates over multiple rounds. However, in cases where there are three or more strong candidates, runoff voting will sometimes produce an absolute majority for a different winner than the candidate elected by the other two.

Advocates of Condorcet methods argue that a candidate can claim to have majority support only if they are the "Condorcet winner" – that is, the candidate who would beat every other candidate in a series of one-on-one elections. In runoff voting the winning candidate is only matched, one-on-one, with one of the other candidates. When a Condorcet winner exists, the candidate does not necessarily win a runoff election due to insufficient support in the first round.

Runoff advocates counter that voters' first preference is more important than lower preferences because that is where voters are putting the most effort of decision and that, unlike Condorcet methods, runoffs require a high showing among the full field of choices in addition to a strong showing in the final head-to-head competition. Condorcet methods can allow candidates to win who have minimal first-choice support and can win largely on the compromise appeal of being ranked second or third by more voters.

Practical implications
In smaller elections, such as those in assemblies or private organisations, it is sometimes possible to conduct both rounds in quick succession. More commonly, however, large-scale public elections the two rounds of runoff voting are held on separate days, and so involve voters going to the polls twice and governments conducting two elections.

Voter fatigue/suppression 
Holding two elections typically leads to voter fatigue and a reduced turnout, especially in the second round. Voter fatigue by design can also be called voter suppression.

Costs
One of the strongest criticisms against the two-round voting system is that the cost to the taxpayer required to conduct two ballots can be nearly twice that of holding a single ballot. The reason the cost is probably not quite double is that an instant-runoff ballot method, for example, may have more-expensive voting machines (at least until more places adopt this method) and the longer vote-counting time could pose additional costs to election administrators.

Political instability 
The two-round voting system also has the potential to cause political instability between the two rounds of voting, adding further to economic impact.

Simple to tally 
In runoff voting, the counting of votes in each round is simple and occurs in the same way as under the plurality methods. Ranked voting systems, such as instant-runoff voting, involve a longer, more complicated count.

Usage 
The two-round system is the most common way used to elect heads of state (presidents) of countries worldwide, a total of 84 countries elect their heads of state directly with a two-round system as opposed to only 21 countries that used single-round plurality (first-past-the-post).

Heads of state elected by TRS in direct popular elections 

 Algeria
 Argentina
 Austria
 Azerbaijan
 Belarus
 Benin
 Bolivia
 Brazil
 Bulgaria
 Burkina Faso
 Burundi
 Cape Verde
 Central African Republic
 Chad
 Chile
 Colombia
 Republic of the Congo
 Comoros
 Costa Rica
 Croatia
 Cyprus
 Czech Republic
 Djibouti
 Dominican Republic
 East Timor
 Ecuador
 Egypt
 El Salvador
 Finland
 France
 Ghana
 Guatemala
 Guinea
 Guinea-Bissau
 Haiti
 Indonesia
 Iran
 Ivory Coast
 Kazakhstan
 Kenya
 Kyrgyzstan
 Liberia
 Lithuania
 Madagascar
 Malawi
 Maldives
 Mali
 Mauritania
 Moldova
 Mongolia
 Montenegro
 Mozambique
 Namibia
 Niger
 Nigeria
 North Macedonia
 Northern Cyprus
 Palau
 Peru
 Poland
 Portugal
 Romania
 Russia
 São Tomé and Príncipe
 Senegal
 Serbia
 Seychelles
 Sierra Leone
 Slovakia
 Slovenia
 Sudan
 Syria
 Tajikistan
 Togo
 Tunisia
 Turkey
 Turkmenistan
 Uganda
 Ukraine
 Uruguay
 Uzbekistan
 Yemen
 Zambia
 Zimbabwe

Legislative chambers exclusively elected by TRS in single-member districts 

 Bahrain (lower house only)
 Comoros (unicameral)
 Republic of the Congo (lower house only)
 Cuba (unicameral)
 Czech Republic (upper house only)
 France (lower house only)
 Gabon (both houses; lower house elected directly but upper house elected indirectly)
 Haiti (both houses)
 Mali (unicameral)
 Uzbekistan (lower house only)

Sub-national legislatures:

 Georgia (United States) (both houses)
 Mississippi (United States) (both houses)
 Montserrat (United Kingdom) (unicameral)
 New Caledonia (France) (unicameral)
 Texas (United States) (both houses)

Legislatures elected by TRS in multi-member districts (majority block voting) 

 Iran – modified; 25% required to win in first round (unicameral)
 Kiribati (unicameral)
 Mongolia – modified; 28% required to win in first round (unicameral)
 Vietnam (unicameral)

Sub-national legislatures:

 French Polynesia (France) – two-round majority bonus system (unicameral)

Legislatures partially elected by TRS (mixed systems) 

 Egypt (both houses; single-member and small multi-member districts, alongside party-list proportional representation in large multi-member districts)
 France (upper house only; indirect elections in single-member and small multi-member districts, alongside party-list proportional representation in large multi-member districts)
 Lithuania (unicameral; single-member districts alongside party-list proportional representation nationwide)
 Tajikistan (unicameral; single-member districts alongside party-list proportional representation nationwide)
 Hungary (until 2010) (unicameral; single-member districts alongside party-list proportional representation in multi-member districts and compensatory seats nationwide)

Other examples of use
Two-round voting is also used in French departmental elections. In Italy, it is used to elect mayors, but also to decide which party or coalition receives a majority bonus in city councils. In the United States, Georgia and Louisiana use the two-round system to elect most state and federal officials, while California and Washington use the nonpartisan blanket primary variant for all elections (see below).

Historically it was used to elect the Reichstag in the German Empire between 1871 and 1918 and the Storting of Norway from 1905 to 1919, in New Zealand in the 1908 and 1911 elections, and in Israel to elect the Prime Minister in the 1996, 1999 and 2001 elections.

See also
Ranked voting systems
Keynesian beauty contest
List of electoral systems by country
Arrow's impossibility theorem

References

External links
ACE Project: Two-Round System
A Handbook of Electoral System Design from International IDEA

Runoff voting
Single-winner electoral systems
Non-monotonic electoral systems